The 2018 Big West men's soccer tournament was the 11th edition of the tournament. The tournament decided the Big West Conference champion and representative into the 2018 NCAA Division I Men's Soccer Championship.  The tournament began on October 31 and concluded on November 10.

The UC Riverside Highlanders won the championship, besting the UC Davies Aggies in penalty kicks after a scoreless draw. The title gives the Highlanders their first ever Big West Men's Soccer Tournament championship. Additionally, the Highlanders earned the conference's auto bid into the NCAA Tournament. Joining UC Riverside was the regular season champions, the UC Irvine Anteaters. The three-time defending champions Cal State Fullerton, were eliminated in the semifinals.

Seeds

Bracket

Results

First round

Semifinals

Final

Statistics

Goals

Assists

References

External links 
 2018 Big West Men's Soccer Championship Central

Big West Conference men's soccer seasons
Big West Conference Men's Soccer Tournament
Big West Soccer